Tropilaelaps is a genus of parasitic mites in the family Laelapidae. Their range spans the Philippines, Thailand, Vietnam, India, Sri Lanka, Afghanistan and Pakistan. Their primary hosts are the larva of Apis dorsata and Apis laboriosa, although after Apis mellifera was imported to Asia, they were found to also be suitable hosts for two species of Tropilaelaps, T. clareae and T. mercedesae. Species can be identified by DNA analysis. They are considered a major economic threat to the beekeeping industry.

Species

 Tropilaelaps mercedesae Delfinado & Baker, 1961
 Tropilaelaps clareae Delfinado & Baker, 1961
 Tropilaelaps koenigerum  Delfinado-Baker & Baker, 1982
 Tropilaelaps thaii Anderson & Morgan, 2007

References

Laelapidae